Tumxuk is a sub-prefecture-level city in the western part of Xinjiang, China. The eastern part of Tumxuk is surrounded by Maralbexi County, Kashgar Prefecture. The smaller western part is near Kashgar.

History
In 1997, Tumxuk City was established.

Geography 

Tumxuk Airport is under construction 15 kilometers away and will, upon completion, also serve the nearby counties of Maralbexi and Kalpin.

Demographics
As of 2015, 101,042 (62.0%) of the 163,101 residents of the city were Uyghur, 60,914 (37.3%) were Han Chinese and 1,145 were from other ethnic groups.

Transportation
The city is served by Tumxuk Tangwangcheng Airport and a branch from the Southern Xinjiang railway.

Works of art
Tumxuk (usually spelled Tumshuq) is a well known archaeological site for Serindian art.

See also 
Xinjiang Production and Construction Corps

Footnotes

External links 
Tumxuk Government website 

Populated places in Xinjiang
Enclaves in China
Xinjiang Production and Construction Corps
County-level divisions of Xinjiang